Ramleh-ye Sofla (also Romanized as Ramleh-ye Soflá; also known as Ramleh, Ramleh-ye Pā’īn, Ramlem-ye Pā’īn, and Rumla) is a village in Abdoliyeh-ye Gharbi Rural District, in the Central District of Ramshir County, Khuzestan Province, Iran. At the 2006 census, its population was 70, in 10 families.

References 

Populated places in Ramshir County